Sunil Shelke  is an Indian politician. He is elected to the Maharashtra Legislative Assembly from Maval, Maharashtra in the 2019 Maharashtra Legislative Assembly election as a member of the Nationalist Congress Party.

References 

Indian politicians
1980 births
Living people
Bharatiya Janata Party politicians from Maharashtra
Nationalist Congress Party politicians
Nationalist Congress Party politicians from Maharashtra